Leo M. Moore (died January 9, 1946) was an American politician and newspaper publisher from Maryland. He served as a member of the Maryland House of Delegates, representing Harford County, from 1935 to 1946.

Early life
Leo M. Moore was born at Principio Furnace in Cecil County, Maryland, to Martha J. (née Kurtz) and Michael Moore. His father was a member of the Maryland House of Delegates.

Career
Moore worked as a printer's devil at the Cecil Whig paper in Elkton, Maryland. He purchased the Democratic Ledger paper from E. H. Pitchett in 1907. He published that paper until his death. He served as president of the Maryland Press Association in 1924.

Moore was a Democrat. He served as a member of the Maryland House of Delegates, representing Harford County, from 1935 to 1946. He served until his death, and his wife, Lena L. Moore succeeded him.

Moore served as director and vice president of the Havre de Grace National Bank. He was also president of the Maryland State Firemen's Association. He served as president of the board of trustees of the Jacob Tome Institution.

Personal life
Moore married Lena Lamm in January 17, 1920. They had two sons and one daughter, Charles M., Leo M. Jr. and Mrs. Breen Bland.

Moore died of a heart attack on January 9, 1946, at his home in Havre de Grace, Maryland. He was buried at Mount Erin Cemetery in Havre de Grace.

References

Year of birth missing
1946 deaths
People from Cecil County, Maryland
People from Havre de Grace, Maryland
Democratic Party members of the Maryland House of Delegates
20th-century American newspaper publishers (people)